Atea College, formerly Carey College, is a private Christian school in Panmure, Auckland, New Zealand.

The school's motto is "Learn to think for yourself". Atea College is a registered Cambridge International Centre, preparing students for Cambridge International Examinations IGCSE and A Level qualifications instead of the National Certificate of Educational Achievement ("NCEA"), which it regards as unsatisfactory. 

This school's curriculum implements a Bible-based worldview.

The school was renamed Atea College in 2019 or 2020.

References 

Cambridge schools in New Zealand
Educational institutions established in 1987
Primary schools in Auckland
Secondary schools in Auckland
Christian schools in New Zealand
Christianity in Auckland
1987 establishments in New Zealand